David José Martínez (born August 4, 1987) is a Venezuelan professional baseball pitcher for the Staten Island FerryHawks of the Atlantic League of Professional Baseball. He has played for the Houston Astros of Major League Baseball.

Career

Houston Astros
In 2013, Martinez played for the Corpus Christi Hooks of the Double-A Texas League and the Oklahoma City RedHawks of the Class AAA Pacific Coast League. He won two consecutive pitcher of the month awards from the Astros.

Martínez was called up to the majors for the first time on August 20, 2013.

Texas Rangers
Martínez signed a minor league deal with the Texas Rangers on November 20, 2014.

Minnesota Twins
On December 15, 2015, Martínez signed a minor league deal with the Minnesota Twins.

Detroit Tigers
He was released on July 7, 2016, and signed a minor league contract with the Detroit Tigers the next day and assigned to the Erie SeaWolves. He was released in March 2017.

Second Stint With Astros
On April 5, 2017, Martinez signed a minor league deal with the Houston Astros. He elected free agency on November 6, 2017.

Uni-President Lions
On February 7, 2018, Martinez signed with the Uni-President Lions of the Chinese Professional Baseball League. He was released on August 16, 2018.

After the 2020 season, he played for Caribes de Anzoátegui of the Liga Venezolana de Béisbol Profesional(LVMP). He has also played for Venezuela in the 2021 Caribbean Series.

Staten Island FerryHawks
On May 18, 2022, Martinez signed with the Staten Island FerryHawks of the Atlantic League of Professional Baseball.

See also
 List of Major League Baseball players from Venezuela

References

External links

1987 births
Living people
Cardenales de Lara players
Corpus Christi Hooks players
Erie SeaWolves players
Fresno Grizzlies players
Frisco RoughRiders players
Greeneville Astros players
Houston Astros players
Lancaster JetHawks players
Lexington Legends players
Major League Baseball pitchers
Major League Baseball players from Venezuela
Navegantes del Magallanes players
Oklahoma City RedHawks players
Rochester Red Wings players
Round Rock Express players
Tri-City ValleyCats players
Uni-President Lions players
Venezuelan expatriate baseball players in Taiwan
Venezuelan expatriate baseball players in the United States
Venezuelan Summer League Astros players
People from Cumaná